The 1952–53 season was the 51st in the history of the Western Football League.

The champions for the first time in their history were Barnstaple Town, and the winners of Division Two were Chippenham Town Reserves, although they could not be promoted as the club's first team was already in Division One.

Division One
Division One was reduced from eighteen members to seventeen after Cheltenham Town Reserves left the league, with two clubs promoted to replace Bristol Rovers Colts and Poole Town who were relegated to Division Two.

Bideford Town, champions of Division Two
Bridgwater Town, runners-up in Division Two

Only one club was relegated from Division One this season in order to even up the numbers in each division.

Division Two
Division Two was reduced from nineteen clubs to eighteen after Bideford Town and Bridgwater Town were promoted to Division One, and Chipping Sodbury and Swindon Town Colts left the league. Three new clubs joined:

Bristol Rovers Colts, relegated from Division One.
Poole Town, relegated from Division One.
Stonehouse Reserves

References

1952-53
4